William Floyd Ragle (February 19, 1892 – June 4, 1939) was an American football coach.  He was the fifth head football coach at Kansas Wesleyan University in Salina, Kansas, serving for one season, in 1915, and compiling a record of 5–4.

Head coaching record

References

External links
 

1892 births
1939 deaths
Kansas Wesleyan Coyotes football coaches
People from Baldwin City, Kansas